Trymalitis escharia is a species of moth of the family Tortricidae. It is found on Guam.

References

Moths described in 1976
Chlidanotini
Moths of Japan